Sean Downs (born February 6 1967) is an American former professional darts player who played in Professional Darts Corporation (PDC) events.

Career
Originally from Oregon, Downs first competed in the BDO World Darts Championship in 1993, where he lost 3-0 to Albert Anstey.

After switching to the PDC, he was brought in to make up the numbers in the inaugural 1994 WDC World Darts Championship, and lost both his group matches to Eric Bristow and Rod Harrington. In the following three years, he would win one game and lose one game each year, never getting out of the group stages. He did make the 1996 World Matchplay quarter-finals after beating Keith Deller and Cliff Lazarenko, before losing to eventual champion Peter Evison.

Downs quit the PDC in 2018.

World Championship performances

BDO
 1993: First round (lost to Albert Anstey 0–3)

PDC
 1994: Last 24 group (lost to Eric Bristow 2–3) and (lost to Rod Harrington 2–3)  
 1995: Last 24 group (lost to Phil Taylor 1–3) and (beat Gerald Verrier 3–0)
 1996: Last 24 group (lost to Keith Deller 2–3) and (beat Kevin Spiolek 3–0)
 1997: Last 24 group (lost to Rod Harrington 1–3) and (beat Shayne Burgess 3–1)
 1999: First round (lost to Harry Robinson 2–3)

References

External links

1967 births
Living people
Sportspeople from Eugene, Oregon
American darts players
Professional Darts Corporation early era players